USS Sachem has been the name of more than one United States Navy ship, and may refer to:

,a sloop of war commissioned in 1776
, a steamer commissioned in 1861 and lost in 1863
, a patrol craft in commission from 1917 to 1919

Sachem